Brucepattersonius igniventris, also known as the red-bellied akodont or red-bellied brucie, is a South American rodent in the genus Brucepattersonius. It is known only from a few specimens from the type locality in Iporanga, São Paulo, Brazil. Although it is threatened by habitat loss, it is protected by Alto Ribeira Tourist State Park.

References

Literature cited
Duff, A. and Lawson, A. 2004. Mammals of the World: A checklist. New Haven, Connecticut: Yale University Press, 312 pp. 
Musser, G.G. and Carleton, M.D. 2005. Superfamily Muroidea. Pp. 894–1531 in Wilson, D.E. and Reeder, D.M. (eds.). Mammal Species of the World: a taxonomic and geographic reference. 3rd ed. Baltimore: The Johns Hopkins University Press, 2 vols., 2142 pp. 

Brucepattersonius
Mammals of Brazil
Mammals described in 1998